Phillip John Aspinall  (born 17 December 1959) is an Australian Anglican bishop who served as Anglican Archbishop of Brisbane from February 2002 to December 2022. and was also the Primate of the Anglican Church of Australia from July 2005 until he stood down on 4 July 2014.

Early life and education
Aspinall was born in Hobart Tasmania, Australia, on 17 December 1959.

He obtained a BSc degree from the University of Tasmania in 1980,
a Graduate Diploma in Religious Education (GradDipRE) from Brisbane College of Advanced Education, a BD degree with Honours from Melbourne College of Divinity in 1988 (through Trinity College (University of Melbourne) and the United Faculty of Theology), an MBA from Deakin University and a PhD degree in education from Monash University.

Aspinall worked as a computer programmer for the Tasmanian Education Department. He has worked in a number of roles in the Anglican Church in Tasmania and Victoria: with the Diocese of Tasmania as diocesan field officer for the Anglican Boys’ Society, the diocesan youth and education officer; deputy warden at Christ College in the University of Tasmania (1980 to 1984); director of parish education at St Stephen's Church, Mount Waverley, in the Diocese of Melbourne (1985).

Ordained ministry
Aspinall was ordained a deacon in Tasmania on 25 July 1987 and a priest two years later. He served as assistant curate, assistant priest and parish priest in various locations in Tasmania including Claremont. He was director of Anglicare Tasmania (1994–1999) was Archdeacon for Church and Society for two years.

Aspinall was consecrated as a bishop on 29 June 1999 in Adelaide where he served as an assistant bishop until December 2001.

In 2003, a widely reported allegation of child sexual abuse by another priest, Louis Daniels, in Tasmania implicated Aspinall as being associated with the circumstances leading to the alleged abuse. Aspinall denied that he was in any way involved with the circumstances of the alleged abuse. The archbishop conceded he had written a reference for Daniels when he was sentenced in 1999. Aspinall was mentioned in the royal commission investigating sexual abuse in organisations.

By his own admission, Aspinall was surprised by a "no religion" campaign which was launched by an atheist lobby group in the lead-up to the 2011 Census.

In terms of social justice issues, Aspinall has spoken out against the ill-treatment of asylum seekers.

Aspinall has encouraged new money-making ventures for the diocese. During the cathedral's completion several fundraising efforts were made.  He has also initiated ventures to allow parishioners to tithe via direct debit and leave their estates to the diocese by distributing information about creating wills that favour the diocese.

Between the retirement of Philip Freier on 31 March 2020 and the election of Geoffrey Smith on 7 April 2020, Aspinall served as interim primate. On August 29, 2022, Aspinall announced his resignation as Archbishop of Brisbane to take effect from 5PM February 2, 2023.

Aspinall retired as archbishop in December 2022.

Personal life 
Aspinall is married to Christa Aspinall with whom he has two children.

In the 2021 Queen's Birthday Honours, Aspinall was appointed a Companion of the Order of Australia (AC).

References

External links
Biography on the Anglican Church of Australia's official website
"Phillip Aspinall Interview", Sunday Profile, ABC website

1959 births
Living people
Companions of the Order of Australia
Anglican archbishops of Brisbane
Assistant bishops in the Anglican Diocese of Adelaide
21st-century Anglican archbishops
21st-century Anglican bishops in Australia
People from Brisbane
People from Hobart
People educated at Trinity College (University of Melbourne)
Deakin University alumni
Primates of the Anglican Church of Australia